The 2014 Protyre Formula Renault Championship was a multi-event motor racing championship for open wheel, formula racing cars held across England. The championship featured a mix of professional motor racing teams and privately funded drivers competing in 2 litre Formula Renault single seat race cars that conformed to the technical regulations for the championship. The 2014 season was the 20th British Formula Renault Championship organised by the British Automobile Racing Club and the third season as the premier Formula Renault 2.0 championship in the United Kingdom. The season began at Rockingham Motor Speedway on 4 May and ended on 28 September at Silverstone Circuit. The series formed part of the BARC club racing meetings at six events all held in England, with three triple header events.

The championship was won by Pietro Fittipaldi, the grandson of two-time Formula One world champion Emerson Fittipaldi, for the MGR Motorsport team. Fittipaldi won 10 of the season's 15 races, including a streak of 8 successive wins over a trio of meetings between May and August. Fittipaldi won the championship by 65 points (on dropped scores) from Scorpio Motorsport's Piers Hickin, who won a pair of races, and like Fittipaldi, recorded 12 podium finishes. Fittipaldi's team-mate Matteo Ferrer finished third in the championship, edging out Fortec Motorsport driver Alex Gill, by five points; both drivers recorded a single win during the season. The only other winner during the season was a third MGR Motorsport driver, as Colin Noble won one of the two races in support of the British Touring Car Championship, at Silverstone.

Teams and drivers
All teams were British-registered.

Race calendar and results
The series formed part of the BARC club racing meetings and at six events, with three triple header events. A championship calendar was released on 20 November 2013, with the final round once again in support of the 2014 British Touring Car Championship. All rounds were held in the United Kingdom.

Championship standings
A driver's best 14 scores counted towards the championship, with any other points being discarded.

Notes

References

External links
 

Formula Renault seasons
2014 in British motorsport
Renault BARC